Tall Gord (also known as Tall Kord) is a village in Hamaijan Rural District, Hamaijan District, Sepidan County, Fars Province, Iran. At the 2006 census, its population was 90, in 22 families.

References 

Populated places in Sepidan County